Japadog is a small chain of street food stands and restaurants located in Vancouver, British Columbia, Canada (there was also a location in New York City which closed in 2013). The chain, which specializes in hot dogs that include variants of Japanese-style foods like okonomiyaki, yakisoba, teriyaki and tonkatsu, is owned by Noriki Tamura.

History

Tamura and his wife moved to Vancouver in 2005. They opened the first Japadog stand that same year. A second stand opened in Vancouver in the summer of 2009. In 2010, they expanded beyond their three mobile stands in Vancouver, opening a sit-in restaurant, allowing them to serve extra items such as desserts and their unique french fries, called "shaked fries." The kitchen staff prepare them by placing the cooked fries in a paper bag and seasoning and shaking them until coated. They also have a trailer location on the pier in Santa Monica, California.

References

External links

Fast food
Hot dogs
Pacific Northwest cuisine
Restaurants in Vancouver
Hot dog restaurants
Cuisine of British Columbia